Karel Fleischner was a male international table tennis player from Czechoslovakia. He won a bronze medal at the 1936 World Table Tennis Championships in the men's doubles, teaming with Adolf Slar. 

Fleishchner was of Jewish origin, and one of a number of Czech athletes who died in Nazi concentration camps.

See also
 List of table tennis players
 List of World Table Tennis Championships medalists

References

Czechoslovak table tennis players
World Table Tennis Championships medalists
Czech people who died in Nazi concentration camps